Yan (Ian) Karlovich Berzin (real name Pēteris Ķuzis; , Kreis Riga (now in Zaube parish), the Russian Empire – 29 July 1938, Moscow, the USSR), was a Latvian Soviet communist politician and military intelligence officer.

Biography 
Ķuzis joined the Russian Social Democratic Labour Party in 1905. According to his former subordinate, Walter Krivitsky, Ķuzis led a guerrilla detachment in his native Latvia at the age of 16, during the 1905 revolution, and was wounded, caught and sentenced to death.  His sentence was commuted because of his youth; after two years in prison, he was deported to Siberia, but escaped. Rearrested and sent back into exile in 1911, he escaped in 1914, and was a private in Russian army until he deserted, in 1916.

Ķuzis joined the Bolsheviks after the Russian Revolution, rising to the rank of general and chief of the Latvian Red Army. From December 1917, he operated in the apparatus of the Cheka and became a principal organizer of Lenin's Red Terror, credited with devising the system of taking and shooting hostages to recover deserters and to put down peasant rebellions in areas controlled by the Red Army. He was recognized by his superiors for his work in pursuing, arresting, and liquidating Russian sailors after the Bolshevik suppression of the Kronstadt rebellion in March 1921. Promoted to head of the Red Army's Fourth Bureau (military intelligence), the GRU, he served from 1920 to 1935.  Among his agents was the prominent German spy Richard Sorge.

He was dismissed in 1935, and served for a year in the Far East. In September 1936, he was sent to Madrid, under the nom de guerre Grishin, as chief military adviser to the Republican side in the Spanish Civil War. In November he transferred to Valencia. On 8 June 1937 he was recalled to Moscow and reappointed to his old post as head of military intelligence on 8 June 1937, after his successor Semyon Uritsky had come under suspicion, but on 1 August 1937 he too was dismissed, and succeeded by A.M. Nikonov, who was also dismissed and arrested a few days later. During the Great Purge as a part of the Latvian Operation of the NKVD, Berzin was arrested by the NKVD on 13 May 1938, and shot on 29 July 1938.

He was rehabilitated in 1956.

Other details 
On 14 December 1948 Alexander Barmine, former chargé d'affaires at the Soviet embassy in Athens, Greece, advised Federal Bureau of Investigation agents that Berzin informed him prior to Barmine's 1937 defection that Owen Lattimore, head of the U.S. Office of War Information in the Pacific during World War II, was a Soviet agent.

Berzin appears in the Venona decrypts under the code name "Starik" ( – "Old man").

References

External links
 Visvaldis Mangulis, Latvia in the Wars of the 20th Century, Chapter VII

1889 births
1938 deaths
People from Cēsis Municipality
People from Kreis Riga
Bolsheviks
Executive Committee of the Communist International
Cheka officers
Cheka
GRU officers
Russian military personnel of World War I
Latvian people of the Spanish Civil War
Soviet people of the Spanish Civil War
Recipients of the Order of Lenin
Recipients of the Order of the Red Banner
Recipients of the Order of the Red Star
Latvian Operation of the NKVD
Great Purge victims from Latvia
Soviet rehabilitations